Dmitri Andreyevich Lesnikov (born 22 June 1999) is a Russian football player. He plays for FC Volgar Astrakhan.

Club career
He made his debut in the Russian Football National League for FC Volgar Astrakhan on 21 May 2016 in a game against FC Sibir Novosibirsk.

References

External links
 
 Profile by Russian Football National League

1999 births
Sportspeople from Astrakhan
Living people
Russian footballers
Russia youth international footballers
Association football forwards
FC Volgar Astrakhan players
Russian First League players
Russian Second League players